Gudrun Gottschlich  (born 23 May 1970) is a German women's international footballer who plays as a forward. She is a member of the Germany women's national football team. She was part of the team at the 1991 FIFA Women's World Cup. On club level she plays for KBC Duisburg in Germany.

References

1970 births
Living people
German women's footballers
Germany women's international footballers
Place of birth missing (living people)
1991 FIFA Women's World Cup players
Women's association football forwards
UEFA Women's Championship-winning players